The White Unicorn is a 1947 British drama film directed by Bernard Knowles and starring Margaret Lockwood, Joan Greenwood, Ian Hunter and Dennis Price. Kyra Vayne appeared as the singer. It was made at Walton Studios by the independent producer John Corfield, and released by General Film Distributors. The film's sets were designed by Norman G. Arnold.  It was also known as Milkwhite Unicorn and Bad Sister (its title in the US).

Premise
At a home for delinquent girls, a troublesome girl (Joan Greenwood), swaps reminiscences with the warden (Margaret Lockwood), who recounts her own unhappy marriage, divorce and tragic death of her second husband.

Cast

 Margaret Lockwood as Lucy  
 Joan Greenwood as Lottie Smith  
 Ian Hunter as Philip Templar  
 Dennis Price as Richard Glover  
 Eileen Peel as Joan  
 Guy Middleton as Fobey  
 Catherine Lacey as Miss Cater  
 Paul Dupuis as Paul  
 Bryl Wakely as Matron of Remand home  
 Joan Rees as Alice Walters  
 Mabel Constanduros as Nurse 
 Lily Kann as Shura  
 Valentine Dyall as Storton  
 Julia Lockwood as Norey 
 Vernon Conway as Son of Pompous Matron  
 Kyra Vayne as Singer  
 Cecil Bevan as Clerk to the Assizes  
 John Boxer as Bill  
 Dorothy Bramhall as Parlourmaid  
 Clifford Cobbe as Drunken Father  
 Amy Dalby as Landlady  
 David Evans as Ted – Parcels Boy  
 John Howard as Kaarlo  
 Noel Howlett as Sir Humphrey Webster  
 Elizabeth Maude as Mrs. Madden  
 Robert Moore as Clerk to the Judge  
 Thelma Rea as Pompous Matron  
 Desmond Roberts as Elderly Roue  
 Stewart Rome as Charles Madden

Production
In December 1946 Phyllis Calvert was scheduled to play the lead.

Filming began in March 1947. The film was made at Nettleford Studios. It was used to help build up Joan Greenwood who Rank were trying to make a star.

Some scenes had to be re-cut for release in the US, notably when Margaret Lockwood and Dennis Prices's characters went on honeymoon together – their twin beds were too close together. Lockwood's daughter had a small role.

Reception
According to trade papers, the film was a "notable box office attraction" at British cinemas in 1947.

AllMovie called it "A "woman's picture" if ever there was one"; but Bosley Crowther in The New York Times was less sympathetic, calling it  "...not an especially dramatic or otherwise appetizing serving of entertainment"; whereas Variety wrote "...his romantic melodrama will have rough handling by the highbrows, but should prove a box office winner. Story is on hokey side, but a tearjerker."

It is not among Lockwood's most highly regarded films.

References

External links

The White Unicorn at Silver Sirens
Review of film at Variety

1947 films
1947 drama films
British drama films
Films set in London
Films set in France
Films set in Finland
Films set in England
Films shot at Nettlefold Studios
Films directed by Bernard Knowles
British black-and-white films
1940s English-language films
1940s British films